In India, a caste is a (usually endogamous) social group where membership is decided by birth. Castes often have related political preferences. Broadly, Indian castes are divided into the Forward Castes, Other Backward Classes, Scheduled Castes, and Scheduled Tribes, though Indian Christians and Indian Muslims can also function as castes.

India's caste system has been influential. One's caste can control access to political power, land, and police or judicial assistance. Castes also tend to influence local politics by being local to certain areas. Political parties in everywhere tend to represent the interests of specific castes. Women in politics tend to be from upper castes. 

In the era of British India, the British institutionalised caste into India's governmental institutions. However, by the 1990s, there was a social movement to empower the lower castes.

Caste and political power

The removal of the boundaries between "civil society" and "political society" meant that caste now played a huge role in the political arena and also influenced other government-run institutions such as police and the judicial system. Though caste seemed to dictate one's access to such institutions, the location of that caste also played a pivotal role. If a lower caste were concentrated enough in one area, it could then translate that pocket of concentration of its caste members into political power and then challenge the hegemony of locally dominant upper caste. Gender also plays a significant role in the power dynamic of caste in politics. Women's representation within the political system seems to also be tied to their caste. Lower, more conservative castes have less female participation in politics than upper, more socially liberal, castes. This has caused a disproportionately large number of upper-caste women to occupy political office when compared to their lower caste counterparts. The hierarchy of caste and its role in politics and access to power and resources has created a society of patron-client relationships along caste lines. This eventually led to the practice of vote banking, where voters back only candidates that are in their caste, or officials from which they expect to receive some kind of benefits.

The caste system has traditionally had significant influence over people's access to power. The privileged upper caste groups benefit more by gaining substantially more economic and political power, while the lower caste groups have limited access to those powers. The caste system distributes to different castes different economic strengths. The upper caste groups can then manipulate the economic and political system to transfer economic strength into political power.

It has been argued by Professor Dipankar Gupta that the role of castes in Indian elections have been overplayed.

Access to power
In rural North India, upper and middle-ranking castes dominate the ownership of land. They were able to transfer this control over wealth into political dominance over the Panchayat decision. The Panchayat is a local government unit that is in-charge of resources disbursement. The dominant caste groups monopolised leadership positions in the Panchayat, thus gaining more opportunities to government contracts, employment and funding.

Access to police and judicial assistance also depends on which caste one belongs to. By bribing, influencing and intimidating the police and judicial officials, the rural north Indian middle and upper castes tend to manipulate the local police and judicial power more successfully. These types of political rent-seeking have also helped secure the supply of rents to dominant castes through other channels such as 'rigging Panchayat elections, capturing electoral booths, and using pre-election intimidatory tactics in elections for the state assembly.' Whether an individual or a group can raise enough money for constant bribes depends on the caste-based socioeconomic status. Hence, the advantage in accessing economic resources not only transfers into but also reinforces the political might of the dominant caste groups. 

Certain scientists and activists, such as MIT systems scientist Dr. VA Shiva Ayyadurai, blame caste for holding back innovation and scientific research in India, making it difficult to sustain progress while regressive social organisation prevails.

Caste, ascribed at birth, is also influenced by where one is born. Political lines in India have often been drawn along caste lines; however, this is only part of the story. Caste is often specific to a particular area. These caste pockets create a locally dominant castes. Because of the political structure in India, local dominance can translate into regional dominance. This concentration of caste population has meant that smaller, less influential castes have the opportunity stake there claims in the political power arena. However, if a non-dominant caste is not concentrated in a particular area, then they are not likely to get any representation without teaming up with another caste to increase their influence. This means that "localized concentration facilitates a space for contesting the domination of State-level dominant caste". For instance, the Maratha-Kunbi caste has concentrations of populations all over the Indian states. They thus managed to receive maximum representation at the state legislature.

Though the caste system factors greatly in determining who makes up the local elites, it also plays a huge role in determining women's influence and representation in the political system. In India's bicameral parliamentary system, women represent a minuscule amount of each house. Of the people's assembly, made up of 545 members, women represent a mere 5.2 percent; and in the State assembly, with 259 members, women make up only 8.8 percent. Both houses have seen an alarming decline in female representatives in the most recent decades. Of the 39 women representatives in the Indian Parliament most were members of higher castes. Caste, which eventually effects class, is one of the most important factors in determining a woman's successful inclusion into the political system. This may be due to the fact that higher castes challenge the role of the traditional Indian woman and so their caste position gives them a greater range of options that are not available to lower more traditional castes. This inflated representation of elite caste in public offices has meant that the impact they have on public policy is disproportionately large in comparison to their actual numbers.

Clientelism
Politics in India highly depended on patron-client ties along the caste lines during the Congress-dominating period. The caste that one belongs to serves as a strong determinant of his or her voting pattern. In India, different political parties represent the interests of different caste groups. The upper and merchant castes such as Brahmin, Rajput and Kayasth and the rich Muslim groups tend to express their interests through the Congress Party. The agrarian upper caste Jats tend to vote for the competing parties. Numerically minor parties, represented by the Jan Sangh, receive votes almost exclusively from the upper and trading castes. However, caste does not solely determine voting behaviours. Discrepancies occur . This means that not everyone from the same caste would vote for only one particular party. The upper caste people have more freedom to vote by political beliefs. The Mandal Commission covered more than 3000 Other Backward Castes. It is thus not clear which parties are associated with each castes.

Loyal groups of voters usually back a certain candidate or party during elections with the expectation of receiving benefits once their candidate is in office. This practice, called "votebank", is prolific throughout most regions of the country. Many political parties in India have openly indulged in caste-based votebank politics. The Congress party used votebank to maintain power; the competing parties constructed votebanks to challenge the Congress dominance of politics.

History 
Historically it has been very hard to change the structure of caste politics in India. More recently however, there has been a flux in caste politics, mainly caused by economic liberalisation in India. Contemporary India has seen the influence of caste start to decline. This is partly due to the spread of education to all castes which has had a democratising effect on the political system. However, this "equalising" of the playing field has not been without controversy. The Mandal Commission and its quotas system has been a particularly sensitive issue.

Colonial history 

The British institutionalised caste into the workings of the major government institutions within India. The main benefactors of this indirect rule were the upper castes or forward castes, which maintained their hegemony and monopoly of control and influence over government institutes long after independence from the British. The state of post-colonial India promised development, rule of law, and nation building, but in reality, was a complex network of patronage systems, which solidified the upper-caste position of dominance over civil service institutions. This network undermined the very promises of 'nation building' that post-colonial India had made and ushered in an area of upper-caste dominance that lasted for the next four decades.

In August 1932, the then Prime Minister of Britain, Ramsay MacDonald, made what became known as the Communal Award. According to it, separate representation was to be provided for communities such as the Dalit, Muslims, Sikhs, Indian Christians, Anglo-Indians and Europeans. These depressed classes were assigned a number of seats to be filled by election from special constituencies in which only voters belonging to these classes could vote.

Caste politics in flux 

By the early 1990s there began a shift in caste politics. The continuation of a one party system, which was the Congress party, composed mostly of upper-caste leadership, came to an end. This was partly due to economic liberalisation in India which reduced the control the state had on the economy and thus the lower castes, and partly due to an upsurge in caste based parties that made the politics of lower caste empowerment a central part of their political agenda. It should be pointed out that these new political parties emerged not on a national level but on a village and regional level, and were most dominant in North India.

These parties view development programs and rule of law as institutions used by upper caste to control and subjugate lower castes. As a result, these new political parties sought to weaken these institutions and in turn weaken the upper caste domination in the political arena in India. Since 'rule of law' was seen as controlled by upper-castes, these new parties adopted a strategy that had to operate outside of this rule in order to gain political influence and lower-caste empowerment.

Political corruption 
Corruption thus translated into power and a means to enter the political arena, once only open to upper caste members. Corruption in India became a way to level the playing field. This struggle for empowerment that was forced to operate outside of the rule of law produced caste-based mafia networks. These mafia-networks began to chip away at upper caste control over state institutions.

However, unlike their predecessor, these caste mafia groups were not concerned with 'development', but mainly viewed elections and democracy as a way of gaining control of the state, which would enable them to level social inequalities. This new state envisioned a government of "Social Justice" through caste empowerment. Within the context of "social justice" corruption pontificated by the caste mafias became tolerated, and in some cases, as in the province of Bihar, even celebrated.

The very nature of caste politics inherently means that there are no boundaries between "civil society" and "political society", as demonstrated by the proliferation caste mafia. The mafia dons became mayors, ministers, and even members of Parliament. Therefore, there was no alternative to fight against these mafia figures and political brokers. Because rule of law was perceived to be a mechanism of upper caste control, corruption used by caste mafia became popularly accepted, as it was perceived to be a means to achieve lower caste empowerment. The corruption elevated to such a level that nearly all elected officials in some towns and regions were also criminals. The upper castes who had used their control over the state to discreetly plunder its institutions for their own gain, were now replaced by the mafia dons who now openly pillaged the state institutions. Many of these elected ministers/mafia dons were jailed for the illegal practices they employed; however, this was widely touted as the upper castes trying to regain dominance by eliminating supporters. Corruption and politics became so common that at a time it was not uncommon for election results to be contested from a prison cell.

Corruption therefore translated into power and a means to enter the political arena, once only open to upper caste members. In this way corruption was seen as a way to level the playing field, and as a result was tolerated and in some villages championed under the banner of "social justice".

In the 1951 election, three ethnic parties challenged the Congress party: the Ram Rajya Parishad, the Hindu Mahasabha, and the Bharatiya Jana Sangh. These three sought to gain support from the Hindu majority. The All India Scheduled Caste Federation bid for support from the ex-untouchable castes. Three of the four ethnic parties gradually disappeared because they were not able to obtain enough votes. In the late 1980s, the Congress began to decline. More non-congress parties started to challenge the Congress dominance. The Bharatiya Janata Party (BJP) descended from the Bharatiya Jana Sangh. It attempted to pit Hindus against Muslims. The Bahujan Samaj Party (BSP) and the Janata Dal (JD) tried to seek support from the Scheduled Castes, and Muslims against the upper castes.

The intense party competitions that started in the late 1970s have also weakened the influence of caste in Indian politics. Traditionally, Indian political parties have been constructed from top-down. Party leaders relied on preexisted patron-client networks to collect votes. Hence, no parties established fixed organisations to keep constant contacts with the village-level. Since 1977, the number of youth participating in politics has significantly increased. Due to the lack of fixed organisations, political parties had to rely on the young village members for political mobilisation. Often, these young villagers exerted more political influence than the upper caste leaders and patrons. The status of these young people in the village depended on how much he could contribute to the economic development of the village. It is easier for the youth to maintain their status by rallying rather than remain loyal to a specific party. This also weakened the influence of caste and clientelism on Indian politics.

In the 1990s, many parties Bahujan Samaj Party (BSP), the Janata Dal started claiming that they were representing the backward castes. Many such parties, relying primarily on Backward Classes' support, often in alliance with Dalits and Muslims, rose to power in Indian states. At the same time, many Dalit leaders and intellectuals started realising that the main Dalit oppressors were the so-called Other Backward Classes, and formed their own parties, such as the Indian Justice Party. The Congress (I) in Maharashtra long relied on OBCs' backing for its political success. Bharatiya Janata Party has also showcased its Dalit and OBC leaders to prove that it is not an upper-caste party. Bangaru Laxman, the former BJP president (2001–2002) was a former Dalit. Sanyasin Uma Bharati, former CM of Madhya Pradesh, who belongs to OBC caste, was a former BJP leader. In 2006 Arjun Singh cabinet minister for MHRD of the United Progressive Alliance (UPA) government was accused of playing caste politics when he introduced reservations for OBCs in educational institutions all around.

In Tamil Nadu, Dravida Munnetra Kazhagam (DMK) party rose to power promising representation of all castes in all important sectors of society.

Caste-based mobilisation 
Studies have published which presented evidence would suggested that the influence of caste has been declining since the mid-1990s, including areas in rural India where the higher class castes held greater dominance over lower class castes, and also in urban interaction and hereditary occupations. Rather than a long-established, unchanging institution, caste is subject to political influence. Changes in political leadership throughout the history of India have led to changes in the structure of the caste system. India's colonial past has shaped caste into a flexible institution, generating a new system that has crucial influences on political mobilisation. In some regions of India, strategic reconstructions of the caste system have taken place. For instance, the Bahujan Samaj Party in the state of Punjab was first initiated by urban political entrepreneurs who belonged to the former lower caste groups. The pliable caste system in the post-independence era acts as a tool for identifying marginal groups and political mobilisation. Various political leaderships can alter and influence the caste system to give different groups of people unequal rights in accessing public services and political competition.

Education 

Education spread to the lower castes after India gained independence. The younger generations of all castes have had access to educational resources since the 1980s. The number of the Scheduled and Backward Castes people receiving education increased at a faster rate than that of the upper caste groups. The spread of education to all castes generated democratising effects. Some representatives of the SC and ST groups obtained access to Congress in the 1950s~1960s (1179). Due to their higher education levels, they are less likely to respond to the upper-caste patrons, but to the needs and interests of the lower castes.

List of castes
For political/government purposes, the castes are broadly divided into
 Forward Castes (30.80% of the population)
 Other Backward Classes (OBC) (about 41.0% of the population)
 Scheduled Castes (about 19.7% of the population)
 Scheduled Tribes (about 8.5% of the population)

The Indian Muslims (14.2%), and Christians (2.3%) often function as castes.

Official lists are compiled by states recognizing the OBC, Scheduled Castes and the Scheduled Tribes. The dividing lines can be ambiguous, several castes have demanded a lower rank so that they can avail the privileges offered. The term upper caste also refers to forward castes, when news reports refer to the Scheduled Castes in relation to the two upper groups.

Delhi
 Yadav
 Jats
 Gurjar
 Tyagi
 Rajputs
 Punjabis

Haryana
 Yadav
 Gujjar
 Brahmin
s (Brahmin belt of Haryana)
Jats
 Saini
 Jangid
 Rajputs

Gujarat
 Kolis
 Gujjar
 Patidar

Andhra Pradesh, Telangana
 Kamma 
 Reddy 
 Kapu

Bihar
 Kurmi
 Yadav
 Dusadh
 Kushwaha or Koeri
 Brahmins (Bhumihars and Maithils)
Rajput

Uttar Pradesh
Gujjar
Yadav
Rajput
Brahmin
Kurmi  
Chamars
Koeri

Jammu & Kashmir
Muslims Gujjars 
Brahmin Sikhs
Dogra Brahmins and Rajputs

West Bengal
 Muslims
 Namasudras
 Matua
 Mahishya
 Gorkha

Karnataka
 Vokkaliga/Gowda in Old Mysuru region (except in Mysuru city, Chamarajanagara, Ballari)
 Kuruba
 Lingayat/Veerashaiva in North Karnataka and Central Karnataka.
 AHINDA (Kannada acronym for minorities, backward classes and Dalits) or MOD (Muslims, OBCs and Dalits) in Bidar, Kalaburgi and Chamarajanagara.

Kerala

Ezhava 
Mapilla 
Nair 
Saint Thomas Christian

Tamil Nadu

Mudaliar 
Vanniyar 
Kongu Vellalar
Nadar 
Mukkulathor Thevar 
Devendrakula Velalar
Reddiyar

Punjab
 Dalits 
Brahmins and Khatris
 Saini 
Jat Sikhs, who tend to support Akali Dal (Badal)

Rajasthan 
 Jats,
Gujjar
Jangid
Meenas,
Rajputs,
Brahmin

Maharashtra
Dhangar
Kunbi (sub caste of Maratha)
Maratha
Mahar
 Malis 
Brahmins

Odisha
Brahmin
Karan
Khandayat, Chasa

Madhya Pradesh
Gujjars
Kurmis
Rajputs
Brahmins

Controversial issues

SC/ST Reservation system 
In 1954, the Ministry of Education suggested that 20 per cent of places should be reserved for the SCs and STs in educational institutions with a provision to relax minimum qualifying marks for admission by 5 per cent wherever required. In 1982, it was specified that 15 per cent and 7.5 per cent of vacancies in public sector and government-aided educational institutes should be reserved for the SC and ST candidates, respectively.

OBC Reservation system 

The Mandal Commission, or the Socially Backward Classes Commission (SEBC), was established in India on 1 January 1979 by the Janata Party government under Prime Minister Morarji Desai with a mandate to "identify the socially or educationally backward classes" of India. It was headed by the late B.P. Mandal an Indian parliamentarian, to consider the question of reservations for people to redress caste discrimination, and used eleven social, economic, and educational indicators to determine backwardness. In 1980, based on its rationale that OBCs ("Other backward classes") identified on the basis of caste, economic and social indicators comprised 52% of India's population, the Commission's report recommended that members of Other Backward Classes (OBC) be granted reservations to 27 per cent of jobs under the Central government and public sector undertakings, thus making the total number of reservations for SC, ST and OBC to 49%.

Though the report had been completed in 1983, the V.P.Singh government declared its intent to implement the report in August 1990, leading to widespread student protests. It was thereafter provided a temporary stay order by the Supreme court, but implemented in 1992 in the central government.

The commission estimated that 52% of the total population of India (excluding SCs and STs), belonging to 3,743 different castes and communities, were 'backward'. The number of backward castes in Central list of OBCs increased to 5,013 (without the figures for most of the Union Territories) in 2006 as per the National Commission for Backward Classes.

See also 
 Caste system in India
 Identity politics
 KHAM theory

References

Further reading
 
 
Jain, Meenakshi, Congress Party, 1967–77: Role of Caste in Indian Politics (Vikas, 1991), 
 Bashiruddin Ahmed. Caste and Electoral Politics. Asian Survey, Vol. 10, No. 11, Elections and Party Politics in India: A Symposium (Nov. 1970), pp. 979–992
 Firstpost News, Signature kids? RSS formula of perfect babies is fed by our own nightmarish hopes
  Hussain, G. (2019). Understanding Hegemony of Caste in Political Islam and Sufism in Sindh, Pakistan. Journal of Asian and African Studies, 54(5), 716–745. https://doi.org/10.1177/0021909619839430
  Hussain, G. (2019). 'Dalits are in India, not in Pakistan': Exploring the Discursive Bases of the Denial of Dalitness under the Ashrafia Hegemony. Journal of Asian and African Studies. https://doi.org/10.1177/0021909619863455

Politics of India
Caste system in India
Identity politics in India